Marita Scholz (born 25 January 1977 in Dresden) is a German rower.

References 
 

1977 births
Living people
German female rowers
Rowers from Dresden
World Rowing Championships medalists for Germany
20th-century German women
21st-century German women